Yakiv Hryhorovych Kutsenko (22 November 1915 – 13 August 1988) was a Ukrainian heavyweight weightlifter. Between 1946 and 1950 he won two European titles and two silver medals at world championships, both times losing to John Davis. He was the Soviet heavyweight champion between 1937 and 1952, and in 1947 set three official world records in the clean and jerk.

Kutsenko served as the Soviet flag bearer at the 1952 Summer Olympics. He was prevented from competing by Soviet authorities who expected the flag bearer to win a gold medal and believed Kutsenko wouldn't be able to achieve that.

References

1915 births
1988 deaths
Sportspeople from Kyiv
People from Kievsky Uyezd
European Weightlifting Championships medalists
World Weightlifting Championships medalists
Honoured Masters of Sport of the USSR
Merited Coaches of the Soviet Union
Recipients of the Order of the Red Banner of Labour
Soviet male weightlifters
Ukrainian male weightlifters
Burials at Baikove Cemetery